OFK Glasinac 2011 (Serbian Cyrillic: OФК Гласинац 2011) is a football club from the town of Sokolac, in Republika Srpska, Bosnia and Herzegovina. It is part of a wider sports society named SD Sokolac. The club competes in the Second League of the Republika Srpska, a third-tier competition in Bosnia and Herzegovina. The club colours are red and blue.

The club has, besides the senior football section, also 4 different youth levels that have traditionally been the first teams of many footballers that later continued their careers in other stronger leagues.

History

FK Glasinac
FK Glasinac Sokolac was formed in 1936. Until 1941 it worked exclusively with youth and contributed to the development of sports in the Romanija region.

After the end of the World War II, its activities were restored in 1949 and it began competing in the regional Bosnian leagues, where it stayed until the break-up of SFR Yugoslavia and the beginning of the Bosnian War in 1992.

In April 1993 the club joined the Football Association of Republika Srpska and started competing in the First league of Republika Srpska. In the seasons 1993–94 and 1994–95 it played in the First League of RS group East, and after the formation of the unified First League of RS it has been a constant member. It played in the 2002–03 and 2003–04 editions of the Premier League of Bosnia and Herzegovina. Since then, it has returned to the First League of RS, now a second national tier.

OFK Glasinac 2011
After FK Glasinac was declared bankrupt in spring 2011, all parties agreed a new club would be established under a different name. Successor OFK Glasinac 2011 then started in the lower leagues, but soon reached Bosnia and Herzegovina's third tier-Second League of RS – East.

Fans
The club fans are named Vandali, in English, Vandals.

Club seasons
Sources:

Notable former players
For a list of current and former players with Wikipedia articles, see :Category:FK Glasinac Sokolac players.

Historical list of coaches
  Mihajlo Bošnjak
  Milan Makić
  Milan Renovica

References

External links
 Club details, history and stadium at opstinasokolac.org., the official site of Sokolac municipality.
 Club page at Soccerway.
 Club at BiHsoccer.

Association football clubs established in 1936
Football clubs in Republika Srpska
Football clubs in Bosnia and Herzegovina
Sokolac
1936 establishments in Bosnia and Herzegovina